Started in 1999 in Québec, Savoir-faire Linux is specialized in open source software and digital electronics. Savoir-faire Linux is one of the largest open source companies in Canada. Headquartered in Montreal, the company has Canadian offices in Quebec City, Ottawa, and Toronto, as well as two French offices in Paris and Lyon.

History 
Savoir-faire was founded in 1999 by Cyrille Béraud and Jean-Christophe Derré. Today, the company has several offices in Canada (4) and France (2).

 1999 : Launch of Savoir-faire Linux;
 2000 : Consultation and support services for Open Source Software;
 2001 : Launch of the Montreal Training Centre;
 2004 : Partnership with Novell for training services. Launch of SFLPhone;
 2005 : Partnerships with LPI, Sophos, and Open-Xchange. Launch of the Quebec City Training Centre; 
 2006 : Partnerships with Red Hat and Zabbix. Opening of the Quebec City Office;
 2007 : Partnerships with Ubuntu, Compiere, Zimbra, and Scalix. Opening of the Ottawa Training Centre;
 2008 : Partnership with Novell (renewed). Opening of the Ottawa Office. Launch of SFLvault;
 2009 : First Certification ISO 9001:2008
 2011 : First Certification ISO 14001:2004

Certifications 
Savoir-faire Linux is certified ISOO 9001 and 14001.

Partnerships 
Savoir-faire Linux is a silver member of The Linux Foundation.

Research and development

Ring 
In 2004, Cyrille Béraud initiates the development of a fully Open Source digital phone for enterprises. SFLPhone is a Softphone designed to manage an unlimited number of lines and calls for enterprises. Compliant with industry standards such as SIP and IAX, it interoperates with Asterisk, the Open Source Software PBX.

Ring builds on SFLPhone, removing its bottleneck and main security risk: the centralized service. Ring uses the same technology as Bittorrent to allow users to find each other, from there allowing them to connect directly one-to-one and one-to-many.

SFLVault
Launched in 2008, SFLVault simplifies the management of access keys and passwords to large portfolio of services.

SFLvault is a networked credentials store and authentication manager. It has a client/vault (server) architecture allowing to cryptographically store and organise loads of passwords for different machines and services.

Leadership 
Savoir-faire Linux is working towards a free world, through the development of Free Software. The team of 100+ consultants share the same values, while focusing exclusively on these technologies. Ring and SFLVault are two examples of projects led by Savoir-faire Linux.

Savoir-faire Linux has gained recognition in Quebec by making the provincial government accountable for its IT practices. Treasury Board President Michelle Courchesne announced the Quebec Government will favour Free Software when it makes economic sense. For example, the Ministry of Education could save $450 million by introducing Free Software in schools.

To influence the legislator, the company first had to take the government to the court. This trial also set a record in Quebec for the first live-tweeted trial. Eventually, the Quebec Superior Court gave reason to Savoir-faire Linux, leading to Bill 133. Savoir-faire Linux, and Cyrille Béraud in particular, has been the voice of IT businesses in Quebec throughout the public consultation for Bill 133.

References

Canadian companies established in 1999
Companies based in Montreal
Electronics companies of Canada